Miguel Angel Gómez Martínez (born May 31, 1974) is a former minor league baseball pitcher who has been a mainstay on the Panama national baseball team in the early 21st century. He was on Panama's roster in the 2006 World Baseball Classic.

Career

Amateur career
Miguel Gomez started his amateur career in Panama Metro youth system, later signed in 1992 by Toronto Blue Jays organization.
Since 2009 plays for Bocas del Toro baseball team aka Turtle-men on the Panama National Baseball Championship, achieving four straight finals with them. In 2009 and 2010 as the number one starter of the team, since 2011 as main closer.
On Game 7 of the 2012 season, saved the game for Bocas del Toro, to win their first national title in 51 years on a dramatic 5:50 hours game.
In the 2013 Finals, on Game 6 was brought as emergency starter and shutout Chiriqui for 6.2 innings, the game finished 1–0, and could be his best career performance.

Minor Leagues
He started his professional career in 1992 with the DSL Blue Jays, going 2–8 with a 7.33 ERA. In 1993, he went 3–0 with a 3.77 ERA for the DSL Blue Jays East, In 1994 injured, then he went 2–0 with a 1.23 ERA for the DSL Blue Jays in 1995. In 1996, he pitched for the Dunedin Blue Jays, going 5–4 with five saves and a 3.38 ERA in 33 games in relief. He pitched for Dunedin and the Hagerstown Suns in 1997, going 4–3 with a 4.93 ERA for the former and 1–1 with an 8.04 ERA for the latter. 1997 was his final season in minor league baseball - overall, he posted a 20–21 record in the minors.

Other Leagues
Played for the Carta Vieja Ronners of Probeis in the winter of 2001–2002, going 5–0 with a 1.12 ERA.
From 2002 to 2003 played for Mexico City Tigers of the Liga Mexicana de Béisbol.

In 2003, Gomez pitched for the Brother Elephants in Taiwan, going 4–3 with a 1.69 ERA. He went 3–3 with a 4.68 ERA with them in 2004, and was released after the season.

International career
During the 2001 Baseball World Cup, he went 2–0 with two saves and a 1.23 ERA.In the 2002 Intercontinental Cup, Gomez went 0–1, allowing six earned runs in 2 innings of work.

Gomez pitched in the 2005 Baseball World Cup, going 2–0 with three saves and 0.49 ERA.During the 2006 World Baseball Classic, he posted an atrocious 45.00 ERA.In the 2007 Pan-American Games, Gomez allowed one run in 11 innings of work.He pitched in the 2008 Americas Baseball Cup, going 1–0 with a 4.26 ERA.

References

External links

1974 births
Living people
Brother Elephants players
Dunedin Blue Jays players
Panamanian expatriate baseball players in Taiwan
Hagerstown Suns players
Medicine Hat Blue Jays players
Mexican League baseball pitchers
Panamanian expatriate baseball players in Mexico
Panamanian expatriate baseball players in the United States
Tigres del México players
2006 World Baseball Classic players
Panamanian expatriate baseball players in Canada